The 460s decade ran from January 1, 460, to December 31, 469.

Significant people

References